Wheeling is a ghost town located in Itawamba County, Mississippi.

Established in the early 19th century following the sale of the Chickasaw lands, Wheeling was a port on the Tombigbee River, located "a few miles below" the village of Van Buren.  Wheeling had a hotel and merchants, though "its life was very short", and Van Buren absorbed its businesses.

The former settlement is today covered by forest, located on the east bank of the Tennessee–Tombigbee Waterway.

References

Former populated places in Itawamba County, Mississippi
Former populated places in Mississippi